Game Night is a 2018 American action comedy film directed by John Francis Daley and Jonathan Goldstein and written by Mark Perez. It stars Jason Bateman and Rachel McAdams and follows a group of friends whose game night turns into a real-life mystery after one of them is kidnapped. The film's supporting cast includes Billy Magnussen, Sharon Horgan, Lamorne Morris, Kylie Bunbury, Jesse Plemons, Michael C. Hall, and Kyle Chandler.

Warner Bros. Pictures released the film on February 23, 2018. It was a commercial and critical success, grossing $117 million worldwide and receiving praise for its originality, humor, script and performances. Plemons was nominated for the Detroit Film Critics Society Award for Best Supporting Actor.

Plot

Husband and wife Max and Annie are avid gamers. They met at bar trivia and Max proposed during a game of charades. Their plans for a baby are complicated by Max's feelings of inadequacy when compared to his successful brother Brooks. They host a regular game night with their friend Ryan and married couple Kevin and Michelle, which they struggle to keep secret from their socially awkward police officer neighbor Gary, especially after he was crushed following his divorce from their other friend Debbie. 

Brooks arrives in Max’s dream car (a Corvette Stingray), humiliates him with a childhood story and offends Annie (who assumed Max was overthinking his issues with Brooks) by offering to host their next game night himself.

When the guests, including Ryan's new date Sarah, arrive at Brooks' rental house, Brooks reveals that he has initiated an interactive role-playing mystery game, promising the winner his Corvette. An actor enters to begin the game but is knocked unconscious by two masked men who kidnap Brooks. Believing this is part of the game, the couples passively observe the fight and then split up to solve the mystery. Ryan and Sarah visit the role-playing company’s office to offer a bribe for the final clue. Kevin and Michelle talk to the actor, leading them to realize Brooks’ abduction was real.

Meanwhile, Max and Annie track Brooks’ phone to a bar and use a “fake” pistol Brooks dropped to hold his captors at gunpoint and free him but Max is shot in the arm after Annie plays with it. Realizing they’re in actual danger, they flee as Brooks confesses that he is a black marketeer: he procured a Fabergé egg for a criminal known as "the Bulgarian" but instead sold it to someone with the alias "Marlon Freeman". With his kidnappers in pursuit, Brooks jumps out of the car to allow Max and Annie to escape.

The couples regroup and, unable to go to the police, decide to recover the egg from Freeman to deliver to the Bulgarian. They show up at Gary's, distracting him with the pretense of a game night while Max uses his police computer to discover Freeman’s real name, Donald Anderton, and his address. After Max accidentally bleeds all over Gary's dog and a shrine dedicated to Debbie, the group leaves and receives a phone call to meet the kidnappers in one hour.

They sneak into Anderton's mansion, where he is hosting an underground fight club. Searching for the egg, Michelle admits to Kevin that she once slept with a man she thought was Denzel Washington while they were on a break, but Kevin determines him to be a celebrity impersonator after seeing a picture of him, and Max tells Annie he may not be ready to have a child. Ryan spots the egg in an open safe, leading to a game of keep away with Anderton’s guards. The group escapes with the egg but accidentally break it, revealing a list inside.

The group meets with Brooks and his captors, only to be captured themselves. Brooks reveals that he has always been jealous of Max’s life and intended for him to win the Corvette all along. They are saved by Gary, who is shot in the chest. Max and Annie comfort him by promising to invite him to every future game night, and he reveals that he faked the entire abduction — including hiring the kidnappers — to trick them into letting him rejoin game night.

He is, however, unaware of the list, which he recognizes as a Witsec list, and they are cornered by the real Bulgarian. Max offers the list in exchange for their lives, but a desperate Brooks swallows the list and is taken to the Bulgarian’s plane. Max and Annie race to the airport in the Corvette and manage to stop the plane, subdue the Bulgarian and his henchman, and rescue Brooks; Max realizes he wants to be a father after all.

Three months later, Brooks is under house arrest for his crimes, but has sold the list on the black market for $3 million (after tipping off the witnesses for $20,000 each). He hosts game night for the group, including Gary, and Annie reveals she is pregnant through a game of Pictionary, while armed men arrive outside. In a mid-credits sequence, Gary looks over his plans to rejoin game night, while in a post-credits scene, his ex-wife Debbie meets Kenny, the Denzel Washington lookalike.

Cast
 Jason Bateman as Max Davis, Annie's husband.
 Rachel McAdams as Annie Davis, Max's wife.
 Billy Magnussen as Ryan Huddle, one of Max and Annie's friends.
 Sharon Horgan as Sarah Darcy, Ryan's co-worker and love interest.
 Lamorne Morris as Kevin Sterling, Michelle's husband.
 Kylie Bunbury as Michelle Sterling, Kevin's wife.
 Jesse Plemons as Gary Kingsbury, Max and Annie's neighbor.
 Chelsea Peretti as Glenda
 Danny Huston as Donald Anderton
 Michael C. Hall as The Bulgarian
 Kyle Chandler as Brooks Davis, Max's brother.

Additionally, the film's directors John Francis Daley and Jonathan Goldstein cameo as Carter and Dan, respectively. Kenny (credited as "Not Denzel") is portrayed by Malcolm X. Hughes, a part-time Denzel Washington impersonator. Jeffrey Wright makes an uncredited cameo as an actor playing Agent Ron Henderson, an FBI Agent.

Production

Development
Producer John Fox had the film's title, and asked screenwriter Mark Perez for story ideas. Perez took inspiration from films like Three Amigos and Tropic Thunder. He pitched the concept to 20th Century Fox, who liked it. The two pitched the project to Jason Bateman, who also liked it. They then sold the idea to New Line Cinema around 2013-2014. Bateman was initially slated to direct, as well as produce and star in the film. When screenwriters Jonathan Goldstein and John Francis Daley were hired to rewrite Perez's script, it became clear to Bateman that the two would also want to direct the film, so Bateman stepped down.

Pre-production
On May 24, 2016, New Line Cinema hired Goldstein and Francis Daley to rewrite and direct the film Game Night, which Jason Bateman produced through Aggregate Films. While Daley and Goldstein did not receive screenwriter credit, they later said they rewrote "almost all of the original script’s dialogue, totally overhauled the characters — most notably a creepy cop portrayed by Jesse Plemons — and comprehensively reworked the original script’s third act."

In January 2017, Rachel McAdams, Bateman, and Plemons were cast in the film's lead roles. In February 2017, Kylie Bunbury joined the cast, while in March, Lamorne Morris, Billy Magnussen, Kyle Chandler, and Sharon Horgan were also added. In April 2017, Jeffrey Wright was cast in the film as an FBI agent, a role he ultimately played uncredited.

Filming
Principal photography on the film began in early April 2017 in Atlanta, Georgia, US.

Release
Warner Bros. Pictures had originally scheduled Game Night for release on February 14, 2018. The date was later pushed back to March 2, 2018, before being moved up to February 23, 2018.

Reception

Box office
Game Night grossed $69.2 million in the United States and Canada, and $48.5 million in other territories, for a worldwide total of $117.7 million, against a production budget of $37 million.

In the United States and Canada, Game Night was released alongside Annihilation and Every Day, and was projected to gross $13–21 million from 3,488 theaters in its opening weekend. The film made $5.6 million on its first day (including $1 million from Thursday night previews). It ended up grossing $17 million over the weekend, finishing second, behind holdover Black Panther. The film dropped 38.8% (above average for a comedy) in its second weekend to $10.4 million, and finished 4th, behind Black Panther and newcomers Red Sparrow and Death Wish. It made $7.9 million in its third weekend, $5.6 million in its fourth and $4.1 million in its fifth.

Critical response
The website's critical consensus reads, "With a talented cast turned loose on a loaded premise — and a sharp script loaded with dark comedy and unexpected twists — Game Night might be more fun than the real thing." On Metacritic, the film has a weighted average score of 66 out of 100, based on 41 critics, indicating "generally favorable reviews". Audiences polled by CinemaScore gave the film an average grade of "B+" on an A+ to F scale, while PostTrak reported that 78% of filmgoers gave it a positive score. Many critics noted the similarity of the plot to that of The Man Who Knew Too Little.

Owen Gleiberman of Variety, gave the film a positive review, saying "Even at 100 minutes, Game Night pushes its premise to the wall of synthetic escapism. Yet the movie manipulates its audience in cunning and puckish ways. It's no big whoop, but you're happy to have been played."

Richard Lawson of Vanity Fair gave the film a positive review, but wrote: "It's a good time, but it maybe could have been a great one. Which I suppose is true of so many nights meant to deliver us from the doldrums of settled life." Jon Frosch of The Hollywood Reporter wrote: "There are chuckles here and there, but a striking absence of belly laughs".

Accolades

Possible sequel
During the film's opening weekend, screenwriter Mark Perez discussed the possibility of a sequel, saying "It would be great to have sequels. Super titles like Game Night or specific titles like that feel genetically built to have sequels... That would mean the movie did well, and that's all I really care about at this stage."

References

External links
 
 

2018 films
2018 action comedy films
2018 black comedy films
American action comedy films
Davis Entertainment films
Dune Entertainment films
Films about games
Films scored by Cliff Martinez
Films shot in Atlanta
New Line Cinema films
Warner Bros. films
Films set in Atlanta
2010s English-language films
Films directed by Jonathan Goldstein and John Francis Daley
2010s American films